Beta-aspartyl-peptidase (beta-aspartyl dipeptidase, beta-aspartyl peptidase, beta-aspartyldipeptidase) is an enzyme. This enzyme catalyses the following chemical reaction

 Cleavage of a beta-linked Asp residue from the N-terminus of a polypeptide

Other isopeptide bonds, e.g. gamma-glutamyl and beta-alanyl, are not hydrolysed.

References

External links 
 

EC 3.4.19